Drexmore is a station stop on the RTA Blue Line in Cleveland, Ohio. It is located at the intersection of Drexmore Road and Van Aken Boulevard.

History

Service by the Cleveland Interurban Railroad began on Moreland (now Van Aken) Boulevard on April 11, 1920 from Lynnfield Road to Shaker Square and then to East 34th Street and via surface streets to downtown. Ownership of the line passed to the City of Shaker Heights in 1944. In 1946, the city wanted to build a turnaround loop in the middle of Shaker Square, and would need to submit the proposal to Cleveland City Council. The Shaker Square merchants resisted, and eventually a compromise was worked out permitting the construction of the loop. In return, the City agreed to construct a new station at Drexmore Road serving the eastern end of the Shaker Square development (the Shaker Square station was on the western side of the Square). The new station opened in January 1948.

In 1980 and 1981, the Green and Blue Lines were completely renovated with new track, ballast, poles and wiring, and new stations were built along the line. The renovated line along Van Aken Boulevard opened on October 30, 1981.

Station layout

The station comprises two offset side platforms in the center median of Van Aken Boulevard, with the westbound platform southeast of the intersection and the eastbound platform north of the intersection. Each platform has a small shelter and diagonal parking is available on both sides of Van Aken Boulevard adjacent to the westbound platform.

References

External links

Blue Line (RTA Rapid Transit)
Railway stations in the United States opened in 1948